Amoscanate (INN), also known as nithiocyamine, is an experimental anthelmintic agent of the aryl isothiocyanate class which was found to be highly effective in animals against the four major species of schistosomes which infect humans, and is also highly active against hookworm infection. However, significant liver toxicity was seen in lab animals at higher doses. The ether analogue of amoscanate, nitroscanate, is used in veterinary medicine as an anthelmintic.

Amoscanate was developed by Ciba.

References

Anthelmintics
Isothiocyanates